Under Hampton Court Bridge is an 1874 painting by Alfred Sisley, now in the Kunstmuseum Winterthur in Switzerland, to which it was given by Dr. Herbert and Charlotte Wolfer de Armas in 1973.

References

1874 paintings
Paintings by Alfred Sisley
Bridges in art
Maritime paintings